The 2014–15 Jacksonville Dolphins men's basketball team represented Jacksonville University during the 2014–15 NCAA Division I men's basketball season. The Dolphins were members of the Atlantic Sun Conference (A-Sun). They were led by first year head coach Tony Jasick and played their home games in both the Veterans Memorial Arena and Swisher Gymnasium. They finished the season 10–22, 4–10 in A-Sun play to finish in a tie for sixth place. They lost in the quarterfinals of the A-Sun tournament to Florida Gulf Coast.

Roster

Schedule

 
|-
!colspan=9 style="background:#004D40; color:#FFFFFF;"| Regular season

|-
!colspan=9 style="background:#004D40; color:#FFFFFF;"| Atlantic Sun tournament

References

Jacksonville Dolphins men's basketball seasons
Jacksonville